The General Union of Syrian Women (GUSW) is an organization that is not funded by the Syrian government but works closely with the government to promote equality from women. The GUSW has its own constitution, bylaws, and infrastructure outside of the government, They have made an effort to eliminate illiteracy among the women of Syria from the ages 6–12 to ensure that they can pursue their education when they grow up. The GUSW advocates for rights beyond equality; they also fight against terrorism and promote literacy for women across their country so that everyone can earn an education in Syria not just men.

The General Union of Syrian Women have orchestrated sit-ins at the United Nations in Damascus to help eliminate terror culture and ask for the UN to start policing countries that are providing weapons and money to terrorist groups. The women that lead this group are searching for clear and fair rights for women in Syria alongside the Syrian government.

The GUSW has also been praised by the Syrian Prime Minister for their work in advocating women's rights. The Prime Minister focused his attention on the part they play in the development of urban areas and their drive to pursue higher ranking status in organizations and fighting for their rights. Over 280,000 Syrian housewives are associated with the General Union of Syrian Women with over 14 different branches and a multitude of different associations to help promote their agenda of equality for women. The GUSW are an information, research, and training center to help teach and provide help for women in Syria.

Notes

Women's organizations based in Syria
Feminism in the Middle East
Feminism in the Arab world